The 2003 Nevada Wolf Pack football team represented the University of Nevada, Reno during the 2003 NCAA Division I-A football season. Nevada competed as a member of the Western Athletic Conference (WAC). The Wolf Pack were led by fourth–year head coach Chris Tormey, who was fired after the end of the season. They played their home games at Mackay Stadium.

Schedule

Game summaries

Southern Utah

at Oregon

at San Jose State

SMU

UNLV

at Washington

at Tulsa

Louisiana Tech

at Rice

Fresno State

Hawaii

at Boise State

References

Nevada
Nevada Wolf Pack football seasons
Nevada Wolf Pack football